The 2008 WPA World Eight-ball Championship was an eight-ball world championship, organized by the World Pool-Billiard Association (WPA), and held 18–25 April 2008 at the Fujairah Exhibition Centre of the Al Diar Siji Hotel in Fujairah, United Arab Emirates. A total of 64 players competed in the tournament.

The event was won by Ralf Souquet, who defeated defending champion Ronato Alcano in the final.

The previous years runner up Dennis Orcollo lost in the semi-final in a repeat of the previous years final to Ronato Alcano 10–9. Marcus Chamat of Sweden also reached the event semi-final, losing to eventual winner Souquet.

The event field was made up of players from various tours, as well as players from a middle east qualifying tournament.

Tournament bracket

Preliminary round 
The following players won one match in the preliminary round, and finished between 33 and 48th

The following players did not win a round in the preliminary tournament, and were ranked 49th to 64th.

Finals

References

External links

Official World 8-ball Championship website

WPA World Eight-ball Championship
WPA World Eight-ball Championship
WPA World Eight-ball Championship
International sports competitions hosted by the United Arab Emirates